The Helmand River (also spelled Helmend, or Helmund, Hirmand; Pashto/Persian: ; Greek:  (Etýmandros);) is the longest river in Afghanistan and the primary watershed for the endorheic Sistan Basin. It emerges in the Sanglakh Range of the Hindu Kush mountains in the northeastern part of Maidan Wardak Province, where it is separated from the watershed of the Kabul River by the Unai Pass. The Helmand feeds into the Hamun Lake on the border between Afghanistan and Iran.

Etymology 
The name comes from the Avestan Haētumant, literally "dammed, having a dam", which referred to the Helmand River and the irrigated areas around it.

Geography 

It rises in the northeastern part of Maidan Wardak Province in the Hindu Kush mountains, about 40 km west of Kabul, flowing southwestward through Daykundi Province and Uruzgan  Province. After passing through the city of Lashkargah in Helmand Province, it enters the desert of Dashti Margo, and then flows to the Sistan marshes and the Hamun-i-Helmand lake region around Zabol at the Afghan-Iranian border. A few smaller rivers such as Tarnak and Arghandab flow into Helmand.

This river, managed by the Helmand and Arghandab Valley Authority, is used extensively for irrigation, although a buildup of mineral salts has decreased its usefulness in watering crops. For much of its length, Helmand is free of salt. Its waters are essential for farmers in Afghanistan, but it feeds into Lake Hamun and is also important to farmers in Iran's southeastern Sistan and Baluchistan province.

A number of hydroelectric dams have created artificial reservoirs on some of the Afghanistan's rivers including the Kajaki Dam on the Helmand River. The chief tributary of the Helmand river, the Arghandab River (confluence at ), also has a major dam, north of Kandahar.

History
The Helmand valley region is mentioned by name in the Avesta (Fargard 1:13) as the Aryan land of Haetumant, one of the early centres of the Zoroastrian faith in areas that are now Afghanistan. However, by the late first millennium BC and early first millennium AD, the preponderance of communities of Hindus and Buddhists in the Helmand and Kabul valleys led to Parthians referring to it as India.

See also
 List of rivers of Afghanistan
 Kamal Khan Dam

Notes

References
 
 Frye, Richard N. (1963). The Heritage of Persia. World Publishing company, Cleveland, Ohio. Mentor Book edition, 1966.
 Toynbee, Arnold J. (1961). Between Oxus and Jumna. London. Oxford University Press.
 Vogelsang, W. (1985). "Early historical Arachosia in South-east Afghanistan; Meeting-place between East and West." Iranica antiqua, 20 (1985), pp. 55–99.

External links

From Wetland to Wasteland: The Destruction of the Hamoun Oasis

 
Rivers of Afghanistan
 
Rivers of Sistan and Baluchistan Province
International rivers of Asia
Sarasvati River
Landforms of Nimruz Province
Landforms of Kandahar Province
Landforms of Zabul Province
Landforms of Kabul Province
Landforms of Daykundi Province
Landforms of Helmand Province